Jan Świerkowski (born 1984) is a Polish curator, artist, cultural researcher and astronomer. He is also the creative director and the curator of an artistic-scientific ensemble Instytut B61. 

In 2010 Świerkowski graduated in astronomy at the Nicolaus Copernicus University in Toruń (Poland), of which he is now an honorary ambassador. Before graduating, he created the Instytut B61 - an ensemble which consists of artists and scientists. It was founded in 2009, as part of the UNESCO International Astronomy Year. As part of the group's activity, Świerkowski creates large-scale artistic performances that combine science and art. Renowned Polish artists cooperated with the group, among others Tomasz Stańko, Stanisław Tym, Michał Urbaniak, and Organek.

In 2012, he became the head of the international art project Cosmic Underground, co-financed by the European Commission as part of the Culture 2007 - 2013 program. The project, inspired by Albert Einstein's Theory of Relativity, gathered around 20.000 viewers. Artists from Poland, Latvia, Estonia, and Portugal traveled for two months by train, stopping at the stations of European cities. A site-specific spectacle about the adventures of the brilliant scientist Joseph Brewster, who studies issues related to the passage of time, attracted viewers from Tallinn to Portuguese Guimarães.

In 2013, Świerkowski received a scholarship from the Polish Minister of Culture and National Heritage. In the same year, together with the rapper L.U.C, he created the music video "Higgs boson" promoting the exhibition "The Universe and Particles" at the Copernicus Science Center in Warsaw.

In 2014, he organized and was the curator of the first ever Polish Culture Festival in Portugal. Since 2016 he has been a member of the Research Center for Communication and Culture research center in Lisbon and a scholarship holder of the Portuguese Fundação para a Ciência e a Tecnologia. In 2016, Instytut B61's spectacular performance The Evolution of the Stars was shown during the celebration of Wrocław Europejska Stolica Kultury 2016. One year later, the same performance became one of the key elements of The Story of Space Festival in Panjim, India. 

In 2019, Świerkowski directed the Interstellar Sugar Center performance in Ponta Delgada, Azores during TREMOR festival of which Forbes wrote: "The experience is euphoric and mind-bending, with a touch of Clockwork Orange. The finale is a deeply poignant song from a dying star, who sounds like a heartbroken Polish Johnny Cash. If this evening had a director, it would, of course, be Stanley Kubrick"In 2022, Świerkowski co-curated (with Olga Marcinkiewicz) the exhibition Understanding Universe in the Polish Pavilion during EXPO 2020. Later that year he directed The Evolution of Stars performance in the Yerevan Opera Theater during the Starmus Festival directed by Garik Isrealian and Brian May. Armenian news agency News.am summed up the performance:"The end of the show in a massive surrealistic lift also had a lasting effect, a kick of adrenalin flavored with the atmosphere of «Solaris». Puzzled and engaged with every atom of our bodies we were like a team of cosmic voyagers who have just discovered the truth behind reality. Isn’t this what science does? It raises the curtain allowing us to see what is happening in the core of our existence."In August 2022, Świerkowski wrote a chapter Instytut B61: Translating the Invisible into Immersive Artsci Theatre for the book Science & Theatre: Communicating Science and Technology with Performing Arts published by Emerald.

Brewster's Cluster 
Świerkowski is a president of Brewster’s Cluster of Kuyavian-Pomeranian Voivodeship - an association, that he established in 2015, of about 20 entities from various sectors: entrepreneurs, non-governmental organisations, artists and Nicolaus Copernicus University. Cluster is concentrated on introducing, both to the market and to its united entities, innovative digital products, which are being developed in accordance with the newest trends in ICT.

Awards 
In 2018, Świerkowski was awarded the title of the Popularizer of Science 2017 in the Activity Leader category by the Polish Press Agency and the Polish Ministry of Science and Higher Education.

References 

Nicolaus Copernicus University in Toruń alumni
Polish curators
1984 births
Living people